The Loire 501 was a single-engined French liaison and training flying boat of the 1930s produced by Loire Aviation. It was operated by the French Navy, remaining in service until 1940.

Design and development

In 1930, Loire Aviation, a subsidiary of the French shipyard Ateliers et Chantiers de la Loire  of Saint-Nazaire, started design of a single-engined flying boat for use as a trainer and a transport in France's overseas possessions.  The resultant aircraft, the Loire 50, was an amphibian high-winged monoplane, with a  pusher Salmson 9AB radial engine mounted above the wing.  Construction was all-metal, with fabric-covered wings. The French government ordered construction of a prototype Loire 50 (together with a prototype of the three-engined Loire 60 flying boat) on 31 March 1931.

The Loire 50 first flew on 7 September 1931. Although it was damaged in an accident in October, it was repaired and entered service in 1932 as a trainer. It was returned to Loire in February 1933, where it was modified with a more powerful ( Hispano-Suiza 9Qd engine, becoming the Loire 50bis, flying in this form on 18 October 1933.  An order was placed for six aircraft similar to the Loire 50bis, designated Loire 501, delivery starting by the end of 1933.  The Loire 501 remained in service at the start of the Second World War, with the last example still in use at Karouba in Tunisia on 15 August 1940.

Operators

French Navy

Specifications

See also

References

Bibliography
 

050
1930s French military reconnaissance aircraft
Flying boats
Single-engined pusher aircraft
Parasol-wing aircraft
Aircraft first flown in 1933